Rhytidops floridensis is a species of fly in the family Ropalomeridae.

References

Sciomyzoidea
Articles created by Qbugbot
Insects described in 1932